In probability theory, the expected value (also called expectation, expectancy, mathematical expectation, mean, average, or first moment) is a generalization of the weighted average. Informally, the expected value is the arithmetic mean of a large number of independently selected outcomes of a random variable. 

The expected value of a random variable with a finite number of outcomes is a weighted average of all possible outcomes.  In the case of a continuum of possible outcomes, the expectation is defined by integration. In the axiomatic foundation for probability provided by measure theory, the expectation is given by Lebesgue integration.

History
The idea of the expected value originated in the middle of the 17th century from the study of the so-called problem of points, which seeks to divide the stakes in a fair way between two players, who have to end their game before it is properly finished. This problem had been debated for centuries. Many conflicting proposals and solutions had been suggested over the years when it was posed to Blaise Pascal by French writer and amateur mathematician Chevalier de Méré in 1654. Méré claimed that this problem couldn't be solved and that it showed just how flawed mathematics was when it came to its application to the real world. Pascal, being a mathematician, was provoked and determined to solve the problem once and for all.

He began to discuss the problem in the famous series of letters to Pierre de Fermat. Soon enough, they both independently came up with a solution. They solved the problem in different computational ways, but their results were identical because their computations were based on the same fundamental principle. The principle is that the value of a future gain should be directly proportional to the chance of getting it. This principle seemed to have come naturally to both of them. They were very pleased by the fact that they had found essentially the same solution, and this in turn made them absolutely convinced that they had solved the problem conclusively; however, they did not publish their findings. They only informed a small circle of mutual scientific friends in Paris about it.

In Dutch mathematician Christiaan Huygens' book, he considered the problem of points, and presented a solution based on the same principle as the solutions of Pascal and Fermat. Huygens published his treatise in 1657, (see Huygens (1657)) "De ratiociniis in ludo aleæ" on probability theory just after visiting Paris. The book extended the concept of expectation by adding rules for how to calculate expectations in more complicated situations than the original problem (e.g., for three or more players), and can be seen as the first successful attempt at laying down the foundations of the theory of probability.

In the foreword to his treatise, Huygens wrote:

During his visit to France in 1655, Huygens learned about de Méré's Problem. From his correspondence with Carcavine a year later (in 1656), he realized his method was essentially the same as Pascal's. Therefore, he knew about Pascal's priority in this subject before his book went to press in 1657.

In the mid-nineteenth century, Pafnuty Chebyshev became the first person to think systematically in terms of the expectations of random variables.

Etymology
Neither Pascal nor Huygens used the term "expectation" in its modern sense. In particular, Huygens writes:

More than a hundred years later, in 1814, Pierre-Simon Laplace published his tract "Théorie analytique des probabilités", where the concept of expected value was defined explicitly:

Notations
The use of the letter  to denote expected value goes back to W. A. Whitworth in 1901. The symbol has become popular since then for English writers. In German,  stands for "Erwartungswert", in Spanish for "Esperanza matemática", and in French for "Espérance mathématique".

Definition
As discussed above, there are several context-dependent ways of defining the expected value. The simplest and original definition deals with the case of finitely many possible outcomes, such as in the flip of a coin. With the theory of infinite series, this can be extended to the case of countably many possible outcomes. It is also very common to consider the distinct case of random variables dictated by (piecewise-)continuous probability density functions, as these arise in many natural contexts. All of these specific definitions may be viewed as special cases of the general definition based upon the mathematical tools of measure theory and Lebesgue integration, which provide these different contexts with an axiomatic foundation and common language.

Any definition of expected value may be extended to define an expected value of a multidimensional random variable, i.e. a random vector .

Random variables with finitely many outcomes
Consider a random variable  with a finite list  of possible outcomes, each of which (respectively) has probability  of occurring.

Since the probabilities must satisfy , it is natural to interpret  as a weighted average of the  values, with weights given by their probabilities .

In the special case that all possible outcomes are equiprobable (that is), the weighted average is given by the standard average. In the general case, the expected value takes into account the fact that some outcomes are more likely than others.

Examples
Let  represent the outcome of a roll of a fair six-sided . More specifically,  will be the number of pips showing on the top face of the  after the toss.
 

If one rolls the   times and computes the average (arithmetic mean) of the results, then as  grows, the average will almost surely converge to the expected value, a fact known as the strong law of large numbers.

The roulette game consists of a small ball and a wheel with 38 numbered pockets around the edge. As the wheel is spun, the ball bounces around randomly until it settles down in one of the pockets. Suppose random variable  represents the (monetary) outcome of a $1 bet on a single number ("straight up" bet). If the bet wins (which happens with probability  in American roulette), the payoff is $35; otherwise the player loses the bet. The expected profit from such a bet will be
 

That is, the expected value to be won from a $1 bet is −$. Thus, in 190 bets, the net loss will probably be about $10.

Random variables with countably many outcomes
Informally, the expectation of a random variable with a countable set of possible outcomes is defined analogously as the weighted average of all possible outcomes, where the weights are given by the probabilities of realizing each given value. This is to say that
 
In many non-mathematical textbooks, this is presented as the full definition of expected values in this context.

However, there are some subtleties with infinite summation, so the above formula is not suitable as a mathematical definition. In particular, the Riemann series theorem of mathematical analysis illustrates that the value of certain infinite sums involving positive and negative summands depends on the order in which the summands are given. Since the outcomes of a random variable have no naturally given order, this creates a difficulty in defining expected value precisely.

For this reason, many mathematical textbooks only consider the case that the infinite sum given above converges absolutely, which implies that the infinite sum is a finite number independent of the ordering of summands. In the alternative case that the infinite sum does not converge absolutely, one says the random variable does not have finite expectation.

Examples

Then, using the direct definition for non-negative random variables, we have

Random variables with density
Now consider a random variable  which has a probability density function given by a function  on the real number line.
 
A general and mathematically precise formulation of this definition uses measure theory and Lebesgue integration, and the corresponding theory of absolutely continuous random variables is described in the next section. The density functions of many common distributions are piecewise continuous, and as such the theory is often developed in this restricted setting. For such functions, it is sufficient to only consider the standard Riemann integration. Sometimes continuous random variables are defined as those corresponding to this special class of densities, although the term is used differently by various authors. 

Analogously to the countably-infinite case above, there are subtleties with this expression due to the infinite region of integration. It is straightforward to compute in this case that

To avoid such ambiguities, in mathematical textbooks it is common to require that the given integral converges absolutely, with  left undefined otherwise.

Arbitrary real-valued random variables
All definitions of the expected value may be expressed in the language of measure theory.

Despite the newly abstract situation, this definition is extremely similar in nature to the very simplest definition of expected values, given above, as certain weighted averages. Moreover, if given a random variable with finitely or countably many possible values, the Lebesgue theory of expectation is identical with the summation formulas given above. However, the Lebesgue theory clarifies the scope of the theory of probability density functions. A random variable  is said to be absolutely continuous if any of the following conditions are satisfied:
 there is a nonnegative measurable function  on the real line such that

for any Borel set , in which the integral is Lebesgue.
These conditions are all equivalent, although this is nontrivial to establish. According to the change-of-variables formula for Lebesgue integration, combined with the law of the unconscious statistician, it follows that

for any absolutely continuous random variable . The above discussion of continuous random variables is thus a special case of the general Lebesgue theory, due to the fact that every piecewise-continuous function is measurable.

Infinite expected values
Expected values as defined above are automatically finite numbers. This is intuitive, for example, in the  case of the St. Petersburg paradox, in which one considers a random variable with possible outcomes , with associated probabilities , for  ranging over all positive integers. According to the summation formula in the case of random variables with countably many outcomes, one has

It is natural to say that the expected value equals .

There is a rigorous mathematical theory underlying such ideas, which is often taken as part of the definition of the Lebesgue integral. The second fundamental observation is that any random variable can be written as the difference of two nonnegative random variables. These are nonnegative random variables, and it can be directly checked that .

Due to the formula , this is the case if and only if  is finite, and this is equivalent to the absolute convergence conditions in the definitions above. As such, the present considerations do not define finite expected values in any cases not previously considered; they are only useful for infinite expectations.
In the case of the St. Petersburg paradox, one has  and so  as desired.
 Suppose the random variable  takes values  with respective probabilities . Then it follows that  takes value  with probability  for each positive integer , and takes value  with remaining probability. Similarly,  takes value  with probability   for each positive integer  and takes value  with remaining probability.
 Similarly, the Cauchy distribution, as discussed above, has undefined expectation.

Expected values of common distributions 
The following table gives the expected values of some commonly occurring probability distributions. The third column gives the expected values both in the form immediately given by the definition, as well as in the simplified form obtained by computation therefrom. The details of these computations, which are not always straightforward, can be found in the indicated references.

Properties 
The basic properties below (and their names in bold) replicate or follow immediately from those of Lebesgue integral. Note that the letters "a.s." stand for "almost surely"—a central property of the Lebesgue integral. Basically, one says that an inequality like  is true almost surely, when the probability measure attributes zero-mass to the complementary event .

Non-negativity: If   (a.s.),  then .

whenever the right-hand side is well-defined. By induction, this means that the expected value of the sum of any finite number of random variables is the sum of the expected values of the individual random variables, and the expected value scales linearly with a multiplicative constant. Symbolically, for  random variables  and constants , we have . If we think of the set of random variables with finite expected value as forming a vector space, then the linearity of expectation implies that the expected value is a linear form on this vector space.
Monotonicity: If  (a.s.), and both  and  exist, then .
Non-degeneracy: If , then  (a.s.).
 If  (a.s.), then . In other words, if X and Y are random variables that take different values with probability zero, then the expectation of X will equal the expectation of Y.
 If  (a.s.) for some real number , then . In particular, for a random variable  with well-defined expectation, . A well defined expectation implies that there is one number, or rather, one constant that defines the expected value. Thus follows that the expectation of this constant is just the original expected value.
 As a consequence of the formula  as discussed above, together with the triangle inequality, it follows that for any random variable  with well-defined expectation, one has .
This is nothing but a different way of stating the expectation of a Bernoulli random variable, as calculated in the table above.
Formulas in terms of CDF: If  is the cumulative distribution function of a random variable , then
 where the values on both sides are well defined or not well defined simultaneously, and the integral is taken in the sense of Lebesgue-Stieltjes. As a special case, for any random variable  valued in the nonnegative integers }, one has 
where  denotes the underlying probability measure.
If the random variables are dependent, then generally , although in special cases of dependency the equality may hold.

Inequalities 
Concentration inequalities control the likelihood of a random variable taking on large values. Markov's inequality is among the best-known and simplest to prove: for a nonnegative random variable  and any positive number , it states that 
If  is any random variable with finite expectation, then Markov's inequality may be applied to the random variable  to obtain Chebyshev's inequality 
where  is the variance. These inequalities are significant for their nearly complete lack of conditional assumptions. For example, for any random variable with finite expectation, the Chebyshev inequality implies that there is at least a 75% probability of an outcome being within two standard deviations of the expected value. However, in special cases the Markov and Chebyshev inequalities often give much weaker information than is otherwise available. For example, in the case of an unweighted dice, Chebyshev's inequality says that odds of rolling between 1 and 6 is at least 53%; in reality, the odds are of course 100%. The Kolmogorov inequality extends the Chebyshev inequality to the context of sums of random variables.

The following three inequalities are of fundamental importance in the field of mathematical analysis and its applications to probability theory.
Jensen's inequality: Let  be a convex function and  a random variable with finite expectation. Then 
Part of the assertion is that the negative part of  has finite expectation, so that the right-hand side is well-defined (possibly infinite). Convexity of  can be phrased as saying that the output of the weighted average of two inputs under-estimates the same weighted average of the two outputs; Jensen's inequality extends this to the setting of completely general weighted averages, as represented by the expectation. In the special case that  for positive numbers , one obtains the Lyapunov inequality  
This can also be proved by the Hölder inequality.
The Hölder and Minkowski inequalities can be extended to general measure spaces, and are often given in that context. By contrast, the Jensen inequality is special to the case of probability spaces.

Expectations under convergence of random variables 
In general, it is not the case that  even if  pointwise. Thus, one cannot interchange limits and expectation, without additional conditions on the random variables. For  define a sequence of random variables

with  being the indicator function of the event . Then, it follows that  pointwise. But,  for each . Hence, 

Analogously, for general sequence of random variables , the expected value operator is not -additive, i.e.

A number of convergence results specify exact conditions which allow one to interchange limits and expectations, as specified below.

Furthermore, let  pointwise. Then, the monotone convergence theorem states that   Using the monotone convergence theorem, one can show that expectation indeed satisfies countable additivity for non-negative random variables. In particular, let  be non-negative random variables. It follows from monotone convergence theorem that 
Fatou's lemma: Let  be a sequence of non-negative random variables. Fatou's lemma states that   Corollary. If  (a.s), then   Proof is by observing that  (a.s.) and applying Fatou's lemma.
Dominated convergence theorem: Let  be a sequence of random variables. Then, according to the dominated convergence theorem,
;

Uniform integrability: In some cases, the equality  holds when the sequence  is uniformly integrable.

Relationship with characteristic function
The probability density function  of a scalar random variable  is related to its characteristic function  by the inversion formula:
 

If  is finite, changing the order of integration, we get, in accordance with Fubini–Tonelli theorem,

where

is the Fourier transform of  The expression for  also follows directly from Plancherel theorem.

Uses and applications 
The expectation of a random variable plays an important role in a variety of contexts. For example, in decision theory, an agent making an optimal choice in the context of incomplete information is often assumed to maximize the expected value of their utility function.
For a different example, in statistics, where one seeks estimates for unknown parameters based on available data, the estimate itself is a random variable. In such settings, a desirable criterion for a "good" estimator is that it is unbiased; that is, the expected value of the estimate is equal to the true value of the underlying parameter.

It is possible to construct an expected value equal to the probability of an event, by taking the expectation of an indicator function that is one if the event has occurred and zero otherwise. This relationship can be used to translate properties of expected values into properties of probabilities, e.g. using the law of large numbers to justify estimating probabilities by frequencies.

The moments of some random variables can be used to specify their distributions, via their moment generating functions.

To empirically estimate the expected value of a random variable, one repeatedly measures observations of the variable and computes the arithmetic mean of the results. If the expected value exists, this procedure estimates the true expected value in an unbiased manner and has the property of minimizing the sum of the squares of the residuals (the sum of the squared differences between the observations and the estimate). The law of large numbers demonstrates (under fairly mild conditions) that, as the size of the sample gets larger, the variance of this estimate gets smaller.

This property is often exploited in a wide variety of applications, including general problems of statistical estimation and machine learning, to estimate (probabilistic) quantities of interest via Monte Carlo methods, since most quantities of interest can be written in terms of expectation, e.g. , where  is the indicator function of the set .

 In classical mechanics, the center of mass is an analogous concept to expectation. For example, suppose X is a discrete random variable with values xi and corresponding probabilities pi. Now consider a weightless rod on which are placed weights, at locations xi along the rod and having masses pi (whose sum is one). The point at which the rod balances is E[X].

Expected values can also be used to compute the variance, by means of the computational formula for the variance

A very important application of the expectation value is in the field of quantum mechanics. The uncertainty in  can be calculated by the formula .

See also
Center of mass
Central tendency
Chebyshev's inequality (an inequality on location and scale parameters)
Conditional expectation
Expectation (the general term)
Expectation value (quantum mechanics)
Law of total expectation—the expected value of the conditional expected value of X given Y is the same as the expected value of X.
Moment (mathematics)
Nonlinear expectation (a generalization of the expected value)
Sample mean
Population mean
Predicted value
Wald's equation—an equation for calculating the expected value of a random number of random variables

References

Literature

External Links

Theory of probability distributions
Gambling terminology
Articles containing proofs